The former Fourth Church of Christ, Scientist,  built between 1929 and 1930, is an historic Christian Science church building located at 3069 North Downer Avenue /  2519 E. Kenwood Boulevard) in Milwaukee, Wisconsin. Designed in the Georgian Revival style of architecture by the noted Chicago-based architect Charles Draper Faulkner, the building features a redbrick exterior with Bedford limestone trim. The first services in the completed building were held on June 29, 1930. Sometime after 1996 Fourth Church relocated to 2011 East Capitol Drive in Shorewood, Wisconsin. Today the building is  the Chinese Christian Church of Milwaukee'

References

Former Christian Science churches, societies and buildings in Wisconsin
Churches completed in 1930
20th-century Christian Science church buildings
Churches in Milwaukee
Charles Draper Faulkner church buildings
1930 establishments in Wisconsin